A partial solar eclipse occurred on June 19, 1917.  A solar eclipse occurs when the Moon passes between Earth and the Sun, thereby totally or partly obscuring the image of the Sun for a viewer on Earth. A partial solar eclipse occurs in the polar regions of the Earth when the center of the Moon's shadow misses the Earth.

Related eclipses

Solar eclipses 1916–1920

Metonic series

Notes

References

External links 

1917 6 19
1917 in science
1917 6 19
June 1917 events